The Show of Shows is a 1929 American pre-Code musical revue film directed by John G. Adolfi and distributed by Warner Bros. The all-talking Vitaphone production cost $850,000 and was shot almost entirely in Technicolor.

The Show of Shows was Warner Bros.' fifth color film; the first four were The Desert Song (1929), On with the Show! (1929), Gold Diggers of Broadway (1929) and Paris (1929). (Song of the West was actually completed by June 1929 but had its release delayed until March 1930). The Show of Shows featured most of the contemporary Warner Bros. film stars, including John Barrymore, Richard Barthelmess, Noah Beery Sr., Loretta Young, Dolores Costello, Bull Montana, Myrna Loy, Chester Conklin, Douglas Fairbanks Jr., Tully Marshall, Nick Lucas, and Betty Compson.

Overview 
The film was styled in the same format as the earlier Metro-Goldwyn-Mayer film The Hollywood Revue of 1929. The high budget of the film meant that although it performed well at the box office, it did not return as much profit as The Hollywood Revue of 1929. The Show of Shows was originally meant to be and advertised as being an all-color talking movie; however, twenty-one minutes were in black and white—17 minutes of the first part and the first four minutes of part two.

The film features nearly all the stars then working under contract at Warner Bros. Virtually all the performers shown would vanish from the studio by 1931, after tastes had shifted owing to the effects of the Great Depression, which began to be felt late in 1930.

The Show of Shows features many of the performers who were popular in silent movies mixed in with hand-picked stage stars and novelty acts. The emcee of the film was Frank Fay, who performed in the style of barbed sarcasm. In an era of almost naive optimism, he stands out as a witty devil's advocate.

Segments 
 Prologue — In a scene set in the French Revolution, Hobart Bosworth as an executioner and H.B. Warner as an aristocrat who is executed on a guillotine. This opening serves to show that traditional stage shows are finished. Up until 1929, most big cities had added stage acts before silent movies. These were costly, and sound films would make them mostly obsolete. As the aristocrat tries to speak, he is interrupted by the executioner, who rants that they have heard his remarks too often and it is time for him to be gone. After the blade falls, the executioner joyously shouts: "Prologue is Dead! On with the Show of Shows!"
 "Military March"— Led by Monte Blue and Pasadena American Legion Fife and Drum Corps. A pageant set entirely on a huge set of steps with the cadets changing formation to provide a series of color effects in a manner that would be popularized much later by Busby Berkeley.
 "What's Become of the Floradora Boys?" — Myrna Loy, Marian Nixon, Patsy Ruth Miller, Lloyd Hamilton, Ben Turpin, Lupino Lane, and many others in a partial parody of the Florodora Edwardian stage show.
 "$20 Bet"— Fay attempts to sing but is constantly interrupted by Chester Morris, Jack Mulhall and Sojin Kamiyama.
 "Motion Picture Pirates" — Featuring Ted Lewis with a fantasy number set of a pirate ship headed by cut-throat Noah Beery and Tully Marshall with Wheeler Oakman, Kalla Pasha, and other well-known movie villains of the era. A group of beautiful girls are captured and saved from an awful fate (almost) by light comedian Johnny Arthur sending up Douglas Fairbanks. The pirates literally blow him overboard. Finally, the day is saved by Ted Lewis, a well-known bandleader at that time who had recently appeared in his own starring vehicle for Warner Bros., Is Everybody Happy? (1929), a film now deemed lost. His trademark was a battered top hat, and his signature tune was "Me and My Shadow".
 "Dear Little Pup" — Performed by Frank Fay. (Shot in black and white.)
 "Ping Pongo" — Performed by Winnie Lightner. (Shot in black and white.)
 "The Only Song I Know" — Performed by Nick Lucas. (Shot in black and white.)
 "If I Could Learn to Love (As Well as I Fight)" — In a brief introductory sequence, missing from circulating prints, French lightweight boxer Georges Carpentier is introduced by Frank Fay, who provokes Carpentier into lightly tapping him with his formidable hands, to which Fay comically overreacts and then beats a hasty retreat. Carpentier was briefly promoted as a star in the Maurice Chevalier mold. He sings here against an Eiffel Tower backdrop accompanied by Patsy Ruth Miller and Alice White and later a singing and dancing chorus of girls. Ultimately, all of them remove their street clothes to reveal athletic togs underneath, and a precision dance routine follows with the participants positioned on an upright series of geometric struts. (This segment is missing from the version currently airing on Turner Classic Movies.)
 "Recitations" — Featuring Beatrice Lillie, Louise Fazenda, Lloyd Hamilton, and Frank Fay. A series of stark poetic recitations that are first performed by each performer whole and then line by line, until when mixed up they form a bizarre and suggestive product. The sequence also includes a parody of the M-G-M song "Your Mother and Mine" and a series of purposely lame and pointless practical jokes.
 "Meet My Sister" — Introduced by a deliberately nervous Richard Barthelmess followed by Hollywood sisters, including Dolores and Helene Costello, singing "My Sister", along with Loretta Young and Sally Blane, Sally O'Neil and Molly O'Day, Alice Day and Marceline Day, Marion Byron and Harriette Lake (later known as Ann Sothern), Viola Dana and Shirley Mason, Lola and Armida Vendrell, and Alberta and Adamae Vaughn. All of the pairs were sisters in real life except for Marion Byron and Harriette Lake, who were not related. The song is partly compromised by having each set of 'twins' representing a different country against a backdrop serving to illustrate each in a display of international stereotypes (Note: this number exists in color from a nitrate full aperture reel held at the BFI National Film Archive).
 Intermission— Title Card (missing from some prints)
 "Singin' in the Bathtub" — Winnie Lightner and a bunch of male chorines send up "Singin' in the Rain" against a huge bathroom set, concluding with Lightner and ex-wrestler Bull Montana singing a parody of the M-G-M song "You Were Meant for Me" from the 1929 film The Broadway Melody. This number was originally slightly longer, and was also printed in black and white on the release prints.
 "Just an Hour of Love" – Performed by Irene Bordoni
 "Chinese Fantasy" — Introduced, via sharp barks, by canine performer Rin Tin Tin, with Nick Lucas singing "Li-Po-Li" and Myrna Loy dancing. (This sequence survives in color.)
 "Frank Fay with Sid Silvers" — A comedy skit with Sid Silvers stepping in as an annoying spectator who is auditioning for a solo spot by showing Frank Fay his own imitation of Al Jolson singing "Rock-a-Bye Your Baby with a Dixie Melody".
 "A Bicycle Built for Two" — Another music hall pastiche featuring Chester Conklin, Douglas Fairbanks Jr, Chester Morris, Gertrude Olmstead, Sally Eilers and others singing the 1890s standard "Daisy Bell" against a deliberately unreal revolving backdrop.
 "If Your Best Friend Won't Tell You (Why Should I?)" — Sid Silvers back with Frank Fay singing about the horrors of halitosis.
 "Larry Ceballos' Black and White Girls" — Introduced by Sid Silvers and danced by chorus girls dressed up in black and white dresses. One half of the girls wear outfits with black fronts and white backs (with corresponding wigs) while the others wear outfits exactly the reverse. As the girls turn about in formation, the lines of dancers switch from white to black or form geometric patterns. Music instrumental "Jumping Jack". A reworking of an almost identical dance routine set to "The Doll Dance", which also appeared in the 1928 two-reeler Larry Ceballos' Roof Garden Revue. As an after piece, the dance appears to begin again but is halted by Louise Fazenda as the "Dancing Delegate" complaining about the costumes and demanding that Fay be brought on stage – which happens so rapidly that he appears without his pants.
 "Your Love Is All I Crave" — A torch song of lost love sung by Frank Fay. Fay introduces the number with a topical series of jokes:  He describes being in a play where the entire cast entered dressed in rags ("It was a futuristic piece"). He also tweaks his own image: "The leading lady called to me: "My Stalwart Youth" ... (I was heavily made up)...."
 "King Richard III (in excerpt from Henry VI, Part 3)" — A Shakespeare extract introduced and recited by John Barrymore.
 "Mexican Moonshine" — Comedy sketch with Monte Blue as a condemned man and Frank Fay as his executioner accompanied by Lloyd Hamilton, Albert Gran, and others as soldiers. It is a parody of Chesterfield cigarette advertising. Much the same idea, parodying a cigarette advertising slogan, also appears in the opening seconds of Gold Diggers of Broadway (1929).
 "Lady Luck" — The film's finale that is over a quarter of an hour. The original Technicolor version starts with Alexander Gray singing a full-blooded version of the song "Lady Luck" inside an enormous ballroom set with huge windows revealing a midnight green sky. Tap dancers (both white and black groups) dance on a highly polished wooden floor. This all ends as Betty Compson walks down the full length of the stage in procession to meet Alexander Gray, and with the whole cast assembled, hundreds of colored streamers drop from the roof as "Lady Luck" reaches a finale.
 "Curtain of Stars" — With the cast appearing with their heads poked through holes in canvas singing "Lady Luck".

Songs featured 
 "You Were Meant For Me" — Music by Nacio Herb Brown, lyrics by Arthur Freed
 "Singin' in the Bathtub" — Music by Michael Cleary, lyrics by Herb Magidson and Ned Washington
 "Lady Luck" — Music and Lyrics by Ray Perkins
 "Pirate Band" — Music by M.K. Jerome, lyrics by J. Keirn Brennan
 "If I Could Learn to Love (As Well as I Fight)" — Music by M.K. Jerome, lyrics by Herman Ruby
 "Ping Pongo" — Music by Joseph Burke, lyrics by Al Dubin
 "The Only Song I Know" — Music by Ray Perkins, lyrics by J. Keirn Brennan
 "My Sister" — Music by Ray Perkins, lyrics by J. Keirn Brennan
 "Your Mother and Mine" — Music by Gus Edwards, lyrics by Joe Goodwin
 "Just an Hour of Love" — Music by Edward Ward, lyrics by Alfred Bryan
 "Li-Po-Li" — Music by Edward Ward, lyrics by Alfred Bryan
 "Rock-A-Bye Your Baby with a Dixie Melody" — Music by Jean Schwartz, lyrics by Sam M. Lewis and Joe Young
 "If Your Best Friend Won't Tell You" — Music by Joseph Burke, lyrics by Al Dubin
 "Your Love Is All I Crave" — Music by Jimmy Johnson, lyrics by Perry Bradford and Al Dubin
 "What's Become of the Floradora Boys?" — Music and lyrics by Ray Perkins
 "Dear Little Pup" — Music by Ray Perkins, lyrics by J. Keirn Brennan
 "Daisy Bell (Bicycle Built for Two)" -written by Harry Dacre

Cast

Credited

Uncredited 

 Anthony Bushell
 Ruth Clifford
 William Collier Jr.
 Jack Curtis
 Sally Eilers
 Pauline Garon

 Julanne Johnston
 Frances Lee
 Otto Matieson
 Philo McCullough
 Wheeler Oakman
 E. J. Ratcliffe

 Dave Silverman
 Louis Silvers
 Ann Sothern
 Lester Stevens
 Ted Williams

Box Office
According to Warner Bros records the film earned $1,259,000 domestically and $336,000 foreign.

Preservation status 
The Show of Shows still survives in a black-and-white 1958 print from an Associated Artists Productions. "Jack Buchanan with the Glee Quartet" is a single reel of a number that was shot but not included in the final cut, being later used for a standalone release as a b/w short.

Certain segments in color of the film have been recovered.  As of June 2018, these are as follows (in the order of their presentation in the film):

1.  "Meet My Sister" – Sequence was shown publicly at the 2015 TCM Classic Film Festival.

2.  "Chinese Fantasy" – Entire sequence is present in commercially available copies of the film.

3.  "Frank Fay With Sid Silvers" – An announcement was made in July 2017 by the Vitaphone Project that portions of this sequence have been recovered, and preservation is ongoing.

4.  "A Bicycle Built For Two" – An announcement was made in July 2017 by the Vitaphone Project that portions of this sequence have also been recovered, and preservation is ongoing.

5.  "If Your Best Friend Won't Tell You" – An announcement was made in July 2017 by the Vitaphone Project that portions of this sequence have also been recovered, and preservation is ongoing.

6.  "King Richard III" – At least one Technicolor specimen frame is known to exist.  This sequence should not be confused with a color test John Barrymore made for RKO in 1933; that test involved a recitation from "Hamlet."

7.  "Finale" – A six-minute segment of this sequence was shown publicly in Australia ca. 1978; this particular print is believed to have been destroyed in the late 1980s. The British Film Archive has extracts from this scene along with snippets from other early film musicals. At least one Technicolor specimen frame from this sequence is known to exist.

8.  "Curtain of Stars" – A four-second segment of this sequence was restored by the George Eastman House.

The Library of Congress maintains a copy (since the 1970s) of the black/white version. 

In 2022 An Unofficial Reconstructed Colorized version has been Uploaded online.

See also 
 List of early color feature films

References

External links 
 
 
 
 
 (The Show of Shows clip starts at 5:30)

1929 films
1929 musical films
1920s color films
American musical films
Film revues
Films directed by John G. Adolfi
Films produced by Darryl F. Zanuck
Warner Bros. films
Rin Tin Tin
Films scored by Edward Ward (composer)
1920s English-language films
1920s American films